Officer is a 2001 Indian Hindi-language thriller film starring Sunil Shetty and Raveena Tandon.

Plot
Officer depicts the life of investigating officer and witness protecting agent Sagar Chauhan (Sunil Shetty), who comes across people who are not what they seem to be and whose intentions are not what he thinks they are. Soon Sagar realizes that he is in a game of deception and crime, and must get to the roots of it to find and expose all involved, even if it is someone he loves.

Cast
 Sunil Shetty as Officer Sagar Chauhan
 Raveena Tandon as Meenal Patel / Namita Sharma
 Danny Denzongpa as Pratap Rai / Dushyant Singh
 Sadashiv Amrapurkar as Lobo
 Yusuf Khurram as Gopal Pandey
 Shehzad Khan 
 Sonia Kapoor as Pratap Rai's  Servant
 Pramod Moutho as Dhanraj Thakur
 Vishwajeet Pradhan as Driver
 Tej Sapru as Officer Pradhan
 Anup Shukla as police Officer
 Shahbaz Khan as Awasti

Soundtrack

References

External links
 

2001 films
2000s Hindi-language films
2001 action thriller films
Indian action thriller films